g3 was a publication targeted towards lesbian and bisexual women in the United Kingdom. It was distributed free of charge and made available in hard copy from gay bars, clubs, cafés and groups; after it ceasing printed publishing in 2013, it was for a time distributed in PDF format on the  g3 website, but that too ceased to be updated in 2016. g3 won the Publication of the Year award from Stonewall in 2009.

g3 was published by Square Peg Media. It was launched in 2001 by Lisa Knight and Sarah Garrett with a circulation of 5,000, and reached a print run of 40,000, and an estimated total readership of 140,000, before ceasing print publication in August 2013. The magazine's content included celebrity interviews, features, and regular travel, music, film, fashion, arts, community and parenting sections. g3 also provided detailed listings for gay bars and clubs across the UK.

See also
 Bisexual community
 List of lesbian periodicals
 List of LGBT periodicals

References

External links
 
 Bishopsgate Institute online archives. Bishopsgate Institute archives relating to g3.

2001 establishments in the United Kingdom
Bisexuality-related magazines
LGBT culture in the United Kingdom
LGBT-related magazines published in the United Kingdom
Online magazines published in the United Kingdom
Defunct magazines published in the United Kingdom
Free magazines
Lesbian-related magazines
LGBT-related mass media in the United Kingdom
LGBT-related websites
Listings magazines
Magazines disestablished in 2013
Magazines established in 2001
Online magazines with defunct print editions